Victoria Fountain may refer to:

 Victoria Fountain (Old Steine Gardens), a fountain in Old Steine Gardens, Brighton, England
 Victoria Fountain (The Plain), a fountain on The Plain, Oxford, England
 Baroness Burdett Coutts Drinking Fountain, a fountain in Victoria Park, London